Abuhatzeira (Hebrew pronunciation) or Abu Hasira (Arabic) is the surname of a family of rabbis. Notable members of the family include, chronologically:
Yaakov Abuhatzeira (1806–1880), Moroccan rabbi, son of the patriarch of the family, R. Shmuel
Israel Abuhatzeira (1889–1984), Moroccan-born Israeli rabbi known as the "Baba Sali", son of Rabbi Mas'ud Abuhatzeira son of Rabbi Yaakov
 (1917-1983), also known as the "Baba Meir", 1st born son of Baba Sali
 (born 1952) also known as Rabbi David, former chief Rabbi of Nahariya
Baruch Abuhatzeira (born 1941), also known as the "Baba Baruch", son and successor of Baba Sali
Elazar Abuhatzeira (1948–2011; murdered), the "Baba Elazar", Moroccan-born Israeli rabbi, son of Rabbi Meir Abuhatzeira son of Baba Sali
Isaac Abuhatzeira (1895-1970), the "Baba Chaki", son of Rabbi Mas'ud Abuhatzeira son of Rabbi Yaakov
Abraham Abuhatzeira (1915-1973), the "Baba Hana", son of the "Baba Chaki"